Everyday, stylized as EVERYD4Y, is the second studio album of South Korean group Winner, released four years after their debut album, 2014 S/S, in 2014. This is the first studio album of Winner after the departure of Nam Tae-hyun. The album was released on April 4, 2018, by the group's record label, YG Entertainment. Like previous albums, the members were credited for writing the lyrics and composing the majority of the album's songs. The album is available in two different designs, Day and Night versions. The Day version has a clean silver background with Winner's "W" mark and the stylized title of the album, while the Night version has a black background with a black and white group photo of Winner sitting on a couch.

Composition
The members produced the majority of the music for this album themselves, with the help of other in-house producers such as Airplay, Millenium, Future Bounce, and others. Title track "Everyday" and its music video was released on April 4. The single is described as a mixture of pop and chill trap with delicate lyrics. The album features a total of twelve tracks, including two special bonus songs in Korean from their Japanese single album Our Twenty For, "Raining" and "Have A Good Day"; as well as Mino's solo song, "Turn Off The Light." "La La" was previously introduced at 2016 EXIT Tour in Seoul.

Track listing

Charts

Awards

Music program awards

Melon Popularity Award

Release history

References

External links 

2018 albums
YG Entertainment albums
Winner (band) albums
Korean-language albums